Terebra argus is a species of sea snail, a marine gastropod mollusc in the family Terebridae, the auger snails.

Subspecies
 Terebra argus argus Hinds, 1844: synonym of Terebra argus Hinds, 1844
 Terebra argus brachygyra Pilsbry, 1921: synonym of Terebra argus Hinds, 1844

References

 Terryn, Y. (2007). Terebridae: A Collectors Guide. Conchbooks & Natural Art. 59 pp + plates
 Liu, J.Y. [Ruiyu] (ed.). (2008). Checklist of marine biota of China seas. China Science Press. 1267 pp.
  Steyn, D. G.; Lussi, M. (2005). Offshore Shells of Southern Africa: A pictorial guide to more than 750 Gastropods. Published by the authors. pp. i–vi, 1–289.

External links
 Kiener L.C. (1834-1841). Spécies général et iconographie des coquilles vivantes. Vol. 9. Famille des Purpurifères. Deuxième partie. Genres Colombelle, (Columbella), Lamarck, 
 Pilsbry, H. A. (1921). Marine mollusks of Hawaii, VIII-XIII. Proceedings of the Academy of Natural Sciences of Philadelphia. 72: 296-328, pl. 12
 Fedosov, A. E.; Malcolm, G.; Terryn, Y.; Gorson, J.; Modica, M. V.; Holford, M.; Puillandre, N. (2020). Phylogenetic classification of the family Terebridae (Neogastropoda: Conoidea). Journal of Molluscan Studies. 85(4): 359-388

Terebridae
Gastropods described in 1844